Devil Tiger is a 1934 American action film directed by Clyde E. Elliott and written by James O. Spearing, Russell G. Shields and Lew Lehr. The film stars Marion Burns, Kane Richmond, Harry Woods and Ah Lee. The film was released on February 8, 1934, by Fox Film Corporation.

Plot

Cast    
Marion Burns as Mary Brewster
Kane Richmond as Robert 'Bob' Eller
Harry Woods as Ramseye Doyle
Ah Lee as Ah Lee
Remow the Tiger as Satan

References

External links
 

1934 films
1930s English-language films
American action films
1930s action films
Fox Film films
American black-and-white films
1930s American films